Herklotsichthys quadrimaculatus, also known as the bluestripe herring, is a species of ray-finned fish in the family Clupeidae. It is widespread in the Indian Ocean and the western Pacific Ocean. Other names for the species include goldspot sardine and fourspot herring. It can grow to a maximum standard length , although its typical length is less than half of that.

References

Pamela J. Schofield. 2017. Herklotsichthys quadrimaculatus. USGS Nonindigenous Aquatic Species Database, Gainesville, FL.

Clupeidae
Fish of the Indian Ocean
Fish of the Pacific Ocean
Fish described in 1837
Taxa named by Eduard Rüppell